The Scotia River is a tributary of the Skeena River in the North Coast Regional District of the province of British Columbia, Canada.

Geography
The Scotia River originates in an unnamed lake fed by several small streams. Its main tributary of the West Fork Scotia River.

The Scotia River's watershed's land cover is classified as 62.5% Coniferous, 21.6% Herb, 19.3% Shrub, and 17.4% Barren.

Natural history
The Scotia River mainstem and west fork support of runs of salmonids such as coho salmon, pink salmon, and steelhead trout. Between the river's source lake and the west fork confluence a waterfall limits anadromous fish passage.

Most of the Scotia River's watershed has been repeatedly logged since the 1980s. In recent decades logging has focused on upland areas, using both conventional and helicopter logging. Logging roads have been built throughout the Scotia watershed and from the West Fork Scotia over a low divide to Carthew Creek, a tributary of the Ecstall River.

See also
List of British Columbia rivers

References 

North Coast Regional District
Rivers of British Columbia
Rivers of the Kitimat Ranges
Rivers of the North Coast of British Columbia
Skeena Country
Range 5 Coast Land District